Ramesh Krishnan was the defending champion but lost in the semifinals to Scott Davis.

Davis won the 1990 Benson & Hedges Open tennis tournament, defeating Andrei Chesnokov in the final 4–6, 6–3, 6–3.

Seeds
A champion seed is indicated in bold text while text in italics indicates the round in which that seed was eliminated.

  Andrei Chesnokov (final)
  Miloslav Mečíř (first round)
  Magnus Gustafsson (quarterfinals)
  Kelly Evernden (first round)
  Amos Mansdorf (semifinals)
  Paolo Canè (first round)
  Paul Chamberlin (first round)
  Scott Davis (champion)

Draw

External links
 1990 Benson & Hedges Open draw

ATP Auckland Open
Benson and Hedges Open